Crveni Otok (Red Island) is a twinned island in the Croatian part of the Adriatic Sea.

History 
The island was probably inhabited in prehistory. In the 6th century, Benedictines built a monastery on the island. The Benedictines left the island in the 13th century and in the 15th century it was taken over by Franciscans who renovated the church and the monastery. In 1809, the island was conquered by France, and in 1892 a cement and lime factory was built on the island using the church tower as a chimney.

References 
Red island (Island of Saint Andrija) on www.rovinj.org

Islets of Croatia
Islands of the Adriatic Sea
Landforms of Istria County